The French Civil and Military High Command was an administrative and military governing body in Algiers that was created in connection with the Allied landings in French North Africa on 7 and 8 November 1942 as part of Operation Torch. It came about as a result of negotiations between the Americans and two military figures from Vichy France who the Americans believed could assure safe passage for the landing forces, namely Henri Giraud and François Darlan.

Giraud was contacted first, and spoke with General Dwight Eisenhower in his military headquarters in Gibraltar, but negotiations were slowed when Giraud demanded too much.  Meanwhile, the Americans contacted Vichy official Admiral François Darlan who happened to be in Algiers, who made a deal with the Allies not to oppose the landings in exchange for being named High Commissioner. This was accepted, and the military-civilian body was first called the High Commission of France in Africa.  The name "Civil and Military High Command" was adopted later by Giraud, who succeeded Darlan after the latter was assassinated, in 1943.

The Commission exercised authority over French Algeria, the French Protectorate of Morocco, the French Protectorate of Tunisia (after its evacuation by the Germans and Italians in May 1943) and French West Africa. In June of the same year, the High Commission merged with the French National Committee, the governing body of Free France, giving birth to the French National Liberation Committee.

The question of loyalties and allegiance was a complex one. Darlan was Minister of the Navy under Philippe Petain and part of the Vichy regime subjugated to Germany, but made a deal with the Allies to allow free passage during Operation Torch in exchange for being named High Commissioner. The French population of North Africa was divided among supporters of Vichy, Gaullists, and others.

Terminology 

The French Civil and Military High Command was first known as the "High Commission of France in Africa" (")". It was also known as the "French High Command" or the "Civil and Military Command of Algiers".

Background 

Unlike Britain, who had supported General  and Free France from the beginning of the War, the Americans had not, and maintained contact with and recognized the Vichy France government.  For this reason, when the Allies began to plan the invasion of North Africa, which was under Vichy control, the American army was given the task, rather than the British, who stayed in the background.

The Americans were planning the last details of the imminent landings in North Africa as part of Operation Torch.  Nominally under control of Vichy France as the entire French colonial Empire was, the situation on the ground in North Africa was complex, with differing loyalties among the French and other population there, including both supporters of Vichy, supporters of 's Free France, and others. The Americans were in negotiations trying to find a way to ensure that the landings would not be opposed, and that they would have free passage thereafter in North Africa.

The new post, based in Algiers and initially called "High Commission of France in Africa" came about as a result of  negotiations between the Americans and two military figures from Vichy France who the Americans believed could assure safe passage for the American landing forces of Operation Torch, namely Henri Giraud and François Darlan.

Henri Giraud 

At the outset of World War II, Henri Giraud was a member of the French Superior War Council, and disagreed with Charles de Gaulle about the tactics of using armored troops. Giraud became commander of the 7th Army when it was sent to the Netherlands on 10 May 1940, and was captured by the Germans. He escaped in April 1942 and managed to slip back into what was by then the collaborationist Vichy France regime. He tried to persuade Vichy leader Marshall Philippe Pétain that Germany would lose and that France should resist German occupation. His views were rejected, but he was not returned to the Germans. Giraud's escape became known all over France. Giraud remained loyal to Pétain and the Vichy government, but refused to cooperate with the Germans. Heinrich Himmler tried to have him assassinated.

Giraud was secretly contacted by the Allies, who were preparing the invasion of North Africa. Giraud was already planning for the day when American troops landed in France, and agreed to support an Allied landing in French North Africa, provided that only American troops were used; like many other French officers he was bitterly resentful of the British, particularly after their attack on Mers-el-Kébir, and that he or another French officer was the commander of such an operation. He considered this latter condition essential to maintaining French sovereignty over North Africa.

The invasion was agreed on at a secret meeting on 23 October with U.S. General Mark W. Clark and diplomat Robert Daniel Murphy, but the Americans promised only that Giraud would be in command "as soon as possible". Still in France, Giraud responded with a demand for a written commitment that he would be commander within 48 hours of the landing, and for landings in France as well as North Africa. General Dwight Eisenhower advised that he should be brought to his Torch operational headquarters in Gibraltar, and on 5 November, Giraud was picked up near Toulon by the British submarine HMS Seraph, arriving on 7 November, only a few hours before the landings. Eisenhower asked Giraud to assume command of French troops in North Africa during Operation Torch and order them to join the Allies. But Giraud had expected to command the whole Allied operation, and adamantly refused to participate on any other basis. He said "his honor would be tarnished" and that he would only be a spectator in the affair.

While Giraud dithered in Gibraltar, a last minute overture to a compatriot of Giraud bore fruit in Algiers.

François Darlan 

To bring a quick end to the resistance and secure French co-operation, the Allies came to an agreement with Darlan, who as commander-in-chief could give the necessary orders. Dwight D. Eisenhower, the Allied commander on the spot recognized Darlan as commander of all French forces in the area and recognized his self-nomination as High Commissioner of France in Africa (head of civil government) for North and West Africa on 14 November. In return, on 10 November, Darlan ordered all French forces to join the Allies. His order was obeyed; not only in French North Africa, but also by the Vichy forces in French West Africa with its potentially useful facilities at Dakar.

History 

Philippe Pétain and the Vichy regime ordered Admiral François Darlan to oppose to the allied landings in North Africa of early November 1942. After a few days, Darlan realized the reality of the balance of power and switched to the Allied camp.
On 13 November, Darlan was recognized as "High Commissioner of France in North Africa" by General Eisenhower.

But on 24 December 1942, Fernand Bonnier de La Chapelle, one of the 7 November activists enlisted in the Corps Francs d'Afrique in World War II, shot Darlan. He was executed, after a summary trial, on 26 December. The greatest confusion reigned. Supporters of the count of Paris, including Henri d'Astier de la Vigerie, attempted to promote the accession to power of the Orléanist pretender to the throne of France.

On 26 December, General Giraud was elected High Commissioner by the members of an "Imperial Council" created by Darlan after proclaiming himself High Commissioner in France and Africa (though this was rejected by Vichy). The candidacy of the "Count of Paris" does not seem to have been considered. That of Charles Noguès, preferred by the Vichystes and whom Giraud would later affirm that he thought of supporting for a while, did not meet with the approval of the Americans and British because of his attitude during Operation Torch.
By an order of February 5, 1943, Giraud took the title of "Civil and Military Commander-in-Chief ". The  of the French High Commission in Africa was replaced, as of February 20, by that of the French Civil and Military High Command. Giraud signed his decrees and orders, as "General of the Army, and French Civil and Military Commander in Chief".

Giraud exercised authority over French Algeria and the French Protectorate of Morocco, while the Tunisian campaign against the Germans and Italians continued in the French Protectorate of Tunisia. Darlan having previously won the support of French West Africa, the latter was also in Giraud's camp, while French Equatorial Africa was in de Gaulle's camp.

Giraud kept a number of Darlan's employees at his side. Several of the Vichy laws continued for a while, tolerated by the United States despite the protests of General Charles de Gaulle. On December 30, Bergeret had several people arrested, most of them Gaullists, who had participated in the Allied operations of November 8 "as a preventive measure".
Under allied pressure, the twelve Gaullists arrested were gradually freed, as were the twenty-seven communist deputies previously interned in Algeria in March 1941. On 20 January, Giraud appointed Marcel Peyrouton, former Vichy Minister of the Interior and actor in the abrogation of the Crémieux Decree to the post of Governor General.

At the beginning of March 1943, several measures heralded a distancing from Vichy. The images of Philippe Pétain and allusions to the Vichy government gradually disappeared from public buildings and official documents. These developments were accelerated by the arrival, at the beginning of March, of Jean Monnet, sent by Franklin Delano Roosevelt to support Giraud. On 14 March, Giraud delivered a speech that he later described as "the first democratic speech of [his] life", in which he broke with Vichy by affirming that the Armistice of 22 June 1940 did not commit France and that the legislation promulgated since then was null and void.

Jean Monnet pushed Giraud to negotiate with de Gaulle after having made initial contact with him at the Casablanca Conference. Several parts of the Vichyist legislation were gradually abandoned. Giraud refused, however, to go back on the repeal of the Crémieux Decree, which would result in restoring French citizenship to the Jews of Algeria, considering that "in North Africa, Jews should not be considered any different from Muslims. They are indigenous people practicing a religion different from that of their neighbors, and nothing else". The decree wasn't reinstated until October. De Gaulle arrived in Algiers on 30 May 1943. On 3 June, the Civil and Military High Command in Algiers merged with the French National Committee in London to form the French National Liberation Committee.

See also 

 Brazzaville Conference
 Allies of World War II
 Charles de Gaulle
 Clandestine press of the French Resistance
 Collaboration with the Axis Powers during World War II
 Empire Defense Council
 Foreign policy of Charles de Gaulle
 Foreign relations of Vichy France
 Free France
 French Liberation Army
 French Resistance
 French Colonial Empire
 French Fourth Republic
 French Third Republic
 German occupation of France
 Italian occupation of France during World War II
 Liberation of France
 Liberation of Paris
 List of French possessions and colonies
 List of Governors-General of French Equatorial Africa
 Military history of France during World War II
 Philippe Pétain
 Provisional Government of the French Republic
 Rene Bousquet
 Vichy France
 Vichy French Air Force
 Vichy Holocaust collaboration timeline
 Zone libre

References 

Notes

Footnotes

Works cited

External links  

Antisemitism in France
French Ministers of Overseas France
French people of World War II
French Resistance
German occupation of France during World War II
Jewish French history
November 1942 events
Military history of France during World War II
Vichy France